The 2013 Indian Grand Prix (formally the 2013 Formula 1 Airtel Indian Grand Prix) was a Formula One motor race held on 27 October 2013 at the Buddh International Circuit, Greater Noida, Uttar Pradesh, India. It was the sixteenth round of the 2013 Formula One season, and the third (and, to date, last) Indian Grand Prix. The race, contested over 60 laps, was won by Sebastian Vettel, driving a Red Bull, from a pole position start. Nico Rosberg finished second in a Mercedes, with Romain Grosjean third for the Lotus team. Vettel's win confirmed him as 2013 Drivers' Champion, as Fernando Alonso could not catch Vettel's points tally with only three races remaining. Red Bull also clinched their fourth consecutive Constructors' Championship.

This would be the last Formula One race at Buddh International Circuit and the last Indian Grand Prix, as of the  season. It is also the last 1-2 finish between German drivers until the 2015 Monaco Grand Prix.

Report

Background
The Grand Prix was contested by eleven teams, each of two drivers. The teams, also known as "constructors", were Red Bull-Renault, Ferrari, McLaren-Mercedes, Lotus-Renault, Mercedes, Sauber-Ferrari, Force India-Mercedes, Williams-Renault, Toro Rosso-Ferrari, Caterham-Renault and Marussia-Cosworth.

Before the race, Red Bull driver Sebastian Vettel led the Drivers' Championship with 297 points; Ferrari driver Fernando Alonso was second on 207 points. A maximum of 100 points were available in the remaining four races, which meant Alonso could still win the title. Vettel only needed a fifth place or higher to become Drivers' Champion, even if Alonso won. Behind Vettel and Alonso in the Drivers' Championship, Kimi Räikkönen was third with 177 points in a Lotus, with Lewis Hamilton and Mark Webber on 161 and 148 points respectively. In the Constructors' Championship, Red Bull were leading on 445 points and Ferrari were second on 297 points, with Mercedes third on 287 points.

In the week leading up to the race, the organisers of the race, Jaypee Sports International attended a court hearing on a dispute over unpaid entertainment taxes from the previous running of the Grand Prix. A court official confirmed, the case would be heard the week after the race, thereby ending speculation that the Grand Prix would be cancelled.

On 21 October, four days before the event's first free practice sessions took place, Toro Rosso confirmed the team was signing GP3 Series driver Daniil Kvyat for the 2014 season, partnering Jean-Éric Vergne.

The drag reduction system (DRS) had two activation zones for the race; one was on the straight between turns 3 and 4, and the second was on the start/finish straight from the final to first corners. The sport's sole tyre supplier Pirelli, provided two specifications of slick compound tyres for the race, designated Medium (also referred to as the "prime" tyre) and Soft (also referred to as the "option" tyre). The Medium compound was distinguished by a white-band with the Soft compound being distinguished by a yellow-band. As was the case for all the 2013 Grands Prix, the rules stipulated that all cars should use both types of tyre during the course of the race, and each driver was limited to eleven sets of dry tyres for the weekend.

Practice and qualifying

Three practice sessions were held before the Sunday race—two on Friday from 11:00 to 12:00 and 14:00 to 15:30 local time, and a third on Saturday morning between 11:00 to 12:00. Vettel set the session's fastest time with a lap of 1 minute and 26.683, almost two-tenths of a second faster than teammate Webber. The Mercedes of Nico Rosberg set the third fastest time ahead of Renault driver Romain Grosjean who was fourth fastest. Hamilton set the fifth fastest time in his Mercedes. The two McLaren drivers were sixth and seventh, Jenson Button ahead of Sergio Pérez. Felipe Massa and Nico Hülkenberg set the eighth and ninth fastest lap times respectively for Ferrari and Sauber. Valtteri Bottas in the Williams completed the top ten. Alonso's Ferrari car was afflicted by a gearbox problem; this restricted him to completing only six timed laps, and he was 12th overall.

During this session, Vettel set the fastest lap of the day, a 1:25.722; Webber finished with the second-fastest time. Grosjean ended up with the third fastest time. The Mercedes drivers were again quick—Hamilton in fourth and Rosberg sixth. They were split by Alonso; with teammate Massa in seventh. Räikkonen set the eighth fastest time. The McLaren drivers ran slower— Button in ninth and Pérez tenth. Williams driver Pastor Maldonado suffered from a loose wheel nut which deflated his right-front tyre, as a result of an earlier pitstop. Williams were fined €60,000.

The start of session was delayed by 20 minutes as the medical helicopter was unable to take off, due to poor visibility caused by smog. The Red Bull drivers were again quickest—Vettel setting the fastest time, a 1:25.332, over half a second faster than Webber. Alonso was able to improve his pace and set the third-fastest time. Hamilton and Rosberg set the eighth and tenth fastest times respectively; they were separated by Button.

Saturday afternoon's qualifying session was divided into three parts. The first part ran for 20 minutes and eliminated the cars from qualifying that finished the session 17th or lower. During this session, the 107% rule was in effect, which necessitated each driver set a time within 107% of the quickest lap to qualify for the race. The second part of qualifying lasted 15 minutes and eliminated cars that finished in positions 11 to 16. The final part of qualifying determined the positions from first to tenth, and decided pole position. Vettel set the fastest time in the second and final parts of the session, which clinched him pole position with a lap of 1:24.119. Vettel was joined on the front row by Rosberg, who was nearly eight-tenths of a second slower.

Ricciardo was the fastest driver not to advance into the final session, qualifying 11th; his best time of 1:25.519 was nearly a second slower than Vettel's pace in the second session. Grosjean (Renault), Jules Bianchi (Marussia), Caterham drivers Giedo van der Garde and Charles Pic and Max Chilton (Marussia) failed to advance beyond the first part of qualifying, and thus completed the final rows of the grid. In the first part of qualifying (the only section in which all drivers took part), the entire field was covered by just over two seconds.

Race

Vettel, from pole position on the grid, held onto the lead into the first corner. Massa, from fifth, made a good start, moving from 5th to 2nd place by the end of the first lap. Maldonado made the best start in the field, moving from 17th to 13th. Going into the second corner, Alonso touched Webber, resulting in damage to his Ferrari's front wing. At the end of the first lap, Vettel led from Massa, Rosberg, Hamilton, Hülkenberg and Räikkönen.

Vettel began to immediately pull clear of Massa. di Resta and Vergne became the first two drivers to pit by coming in on lap 2. Vettel pitted for a new set of medium compound tyres at the end of lap 2, allowing Massa to take the lead.

On lap 40, Webber suffered an alternator failure and became the third retirement of the race.

Vettel was crowned the 2013 Drivers' Championship as Alonso could not catch his points total with three races remaining. He became the fourth driver after Michael Schumacher, Juan Manuel Fangio and Alain Prost to have won four or more Drivers' Championships. Rosberg finished second in his Mercedes car, 29 seconds behind Vettel, with Grosjean third. Massa was fourth in his Ferrari with Pérez fifth for McLaren. Hamilton took sixth place in the other Mercedes and Räikkönen took seventh in the other Lotus car. The Force India cars of di Resta and Sutil were eighth and ninth respectively, with Ricciardo taking the final point in tenth place for Toro Rosso. Alonso finished eleventh with Maldonado trailing behind in twelfth. Vergne, Button, Gutiérrez and Bottas filled the next places, one lap behind the leader, while Chilton and Bianchi were two laps down in seventeenth and eighteenth. Hülkenberg was the final classified driver in nineteenth.

Post-race
The top three finishers appeared on the podium to collect their trophies, and in the subsequent press conference. Sebastian Vettel was given a reprimand for failing to drive straight to parc fermé after the race, while Red Bull Racing were given a €25,000 fine for failing to adequately instruct him to do so.

Classification

Qualifying

Race

1 - Nico Hülkenberg retired from the race, but was classified of 90% of the winner.

Championship standings after the race

Drivers' Championship standings

Constructors' Championship standings

 Note: Only the top five positions are included for both sets of standings.

References

External links

Indian
Grand Prix
Indian Grand Prix
Indian Grand Prix